Monroe (historically ) is the eighth-largest city in the U.S. state of Louisiana, and parish seat of Ouachita Parish. With a 2020 census-tabulated population of 47,702, it is the principal city of the Monroe metropolitan statistical area, the second-largest metropolitan area in North Louisiana.

Etymology
As governor of Louisiana, Esteban Rodríguez Miró had Fort Miro built in 1791. Fort Miro changed its name to Monroe to commemorate the first arrival of the steamboat James Monroe in the spring of 1820. The ship's arrival was the single event, in the minds of local residents, that transformed the outpost into a town.

Credit for the name is indirectly given to James Monroe of Virginia, the fifth President of the United States, for whom the ship was named. The steamboat is depicted in a mural at the main branch of the Ouachita Parish Public Library.

History

Early history–late 20th century 

Monroe's origins date back to the Spanish colonial period.

Fort Miro changed its name to Monroe to commemorate the first arrival of the steamboat James Monroe in the spring of 1820 (see "Etymology" above).
 
During the American Civil War, Monroe and Opelousas, the seat of St. Landry Parish in southern Louisiana, had Confederate training camps. They were established after the fall of New Orleans to the Union in 1862. Conscripts were soon sent to both camps. In 1862, Monroe and Delhi in Richland Parish became overcrowded with unwelcome refugees from rural areas to the east.

They had fled the forces of Union General U.S. Grant, who moved into northeastern Louisiana and spent the winter of 1862–1863 at Winter Quarters south of Newellton in Tensas Parish. He was preparing for the siege of Vicksburg, Mississippi, not completed until July 4, 1863. Historian John D. Winters reported "strong Union sympathy" in both Delhi and Monroe. As the refugees moved farther west toward Minden in Webster Parish, many of the residents, themselves very poor, refused to sell them food or shelter and treated them with contempt.

Union boats came up the Ouachita River to Monroe to trade coffee, liquor, dry goods, and money for cotton. "Confederate officers were accused by a citizen of encouraging the trade and of fraternizing with the enemy, eating their oysters, and drinking their liquor." As the war continued, deserters and stragglers about Monroe became "so plentiful that the Union Army sent a special detachment" from Alexandria to apprehend them.

In 1913, Joseph A. Biedenharn, the first bottler of Coca-Cola, moved to Monroe from Vicksburg, Mississippi. Until Biedenharn's breakthrough, Coca-Cola had been available only when individually mixed at the soda fountain. Biedenharn and his son Malcolm were among the founders of Delta Air Lines, originally Delta Dusters. That company was founded in Tallulah, Louisiana in Madison Parish. It was based on products and processes developed by the Agriculture Experimental Station to dust crops from airplanes in order to combat the boll weevil, which was destroying cotton crops. Biedenharn's home and gardens have been preserved and are now operated as the Biedenharn Museum and Gardens and are open to the public.

Collett E. Woolman, the Ouachita Parish agent, was originally from Indiana. He pioneered crop dusting to eradicate the boll weevil, which destroyed cotton throughout the Mississippi Delta in the early 20th century. Woolman originated the first crop-dusting service in the world. The collapse of cotton production meant a widespread loss of farm jobs, which contributed to the early-20th-century Great Migration, when a total of 1.5 million African-Americans left the rural South for jobs in northern and midwestern cities. They were also escaping the oppressive racial conditions and violence under Jim Crow and the disenfranchisement that excluded most blacks from the political system.
Howard D. Griffin (1911-1986) purchased a boat dealership in 1936 while a student at what became the University of Louisiana Monroe. By the 1960s, Griffin's company had become the world's largest outboard motor dealership, and he also sold motorcycles. From 1955 to 1985, Griffin and his wife, Birdie M. Griffin (1915-1985), operated their seasonal Land O' Toys store in Monroe.

Geography 
Located in northeastern Louisiana, Monroe is the center of the Monroe metropolitan statistical area. It is the parish seat of Ouachita Parish, and northeastern Louisiana's economic and cultural hub. According to the United States Census Bureau, the city has a total area of 31.6 square miles (83.9 km), of which, 28.7 square miles (74.3 km) of it is land and 3.7 square miles (9.6 km) of it is water. The total area is 11.46% water.

Climate 
Monroe has a humid subtropical climate (Köppen climate classification Cfa). Severe thunderstorms with heavy rain, hail, damaging winds and tornadoes occur in the area during the spring and summer months.

The winter months are normally mild, with an average of 35 days of freezing or below-freezing temperatures per year, with ice and sleet storms possible. Summer months are hot and humid, with maximum temperatures exceeding 90 degrees an average of 91 days per year, with high to very high relative average humidity, sometimes exceeding the 90 percent level.

Notable natural disasters

March 2016 flood
In March 2016, rainfall amounts ranging between 15 and 20 inches fell area-wide over 3 days, more than any 3-day period ever previously recorded. In Ouachita Parish alone, there were 9,500 homes with flood damage, and 5,400 were completely flooded. More than 1,700 high-water rescues were performed.

2020 tornado
As part of the 2020 Easter tornado outbreak, on April 12, the community was struck by a low-end EF3 tornado. Damage was severe, but there were no deaths or injuries due to advance warnings.

Demographics 

According to the 2020 United States census, there were 47,702 people, 17,327 households, and 9,811 families residing in the city. At the 2019 American Community Survey, there were 48,241 people and 17,327 households. In 2010, the population was 48,815, declining from the city's historic high of 57,597 at the 1980 U.S. census.

Of the 17,327 households in 2019, there were 7,409 owner-occupied housing units. An estimated 3,493 of owner-occupied housing units were married couples living together; 354 were male households with no female present, and 927 were female households with no male present. There was an average family size of 3.58; 27.4% of all households were married couples living together, 29.8% were male households with no female present, and 46.4% were female households with no male present.

The median income for a household in the city was $30,438 versus $51,073 nationwide. Families had an annual median income of $38,374, married-couple families $75,089, and non-family households $21,210. Approximately 36.8% of the population lived at or below the poverty line; 54.1% under 18 years, 32.2% aged 18 to 16, and 21.3% aged 65 and older lived at or below the poverty line in 2019.

In 2019, the racial and ethnic makeup of the city was 62.0% Black or African American, 32.7% non-Hispanic or Latin American white, 0.2% American Indian and Alaska Native, 0.8% Asian, 1.0% some other race, 0.9% two or more races, and 2.3% Hispanic and Latin American of any race. Among the Hispanic and Latin American population at the 2019 American Community Survey, the largest groups were Mexican Americans (1.2%) and Puerto Ricans (0.1%). Other Hispanic and Latin Americans made up 1.0% of the total population. Vietnamese and Chinese Americans were the largest Asian American groups in the city, followed by Asian Indians; the Vietnamese community in Monroe and the rest of Louisiana grew following the Vietnam War.

Religion 

As part of the Bible Belt, Christianity is the largest religion in Monroe, the city's metropolitan area, and North Louisiana. In common with much of northern and Central Louisiana, Baptists makes up the largest Christian denomination by affiliation. As a predominantly-African-American city, the largest Baptist denominations are the National Baptist Convention, USA; the National Baptist Convention of America; and the Progressive National Baptist Convention. The Southern Baptist Convention also has churches throughout the Monroe area. 

Methodism make up the second-largest Christian denomination by affiliation, primarily divided among the African Methodist Episcopal and Christian Methodist Episcopal churches. The Catholic Church is the third-largest, and the city's Catholic population is served by the Roman Catholic Diocese of Shreveport as of 2021. Pentecostalism is a growing tradition among the population, divided among Classical Pentecostals, and Oneness Pentecostals. The Church of God in Christ and United Pentecostal Church are the largest Pentecostal denominations in the city and metropolitan area; there are also some independent Oneness Pentecostal churches in the city.

Islam is Monroe's second-largest religion. Muslims are predominantly Sunni, though the Nation of Islam also maintains a presence in the area. Former mayor Jamie Mayo controversially awarded a key to the city to the head of the Nation of Islam Louis Farrakhan.

Judaism is Monroe's third-largest religion, with most being of the Reform denomination. Temple B'nai Israel, established in 1868, is Monroe's oldest synagogue.

Economy

Top employers

According to the city's 2018 comprehensive annual financial report, the top employers in the area are:

Education

Colleges and universities
 Career Technical College
 Louisiana Delta Community College
 McCann School of Business & Technology
 Northeast Louisiana Technical College
 UniTech Training Academy
 University of Louisiana Monroe

High schools
Carroll High School
Geneva Academy
Neville High School
Ouachita Christian High School
Ouachita Parish High School
Richwood High School
Riser High School
River Oaks School
St. Frederick Catholic High School
Sterlington High School
Vision Academy
Wossman High School
West Monroe High School

Monroe's department of education, Monroe City Schools, operates separately from the larger Ouachita Parish School System. The department consists of three high schools, three junior high schools, and 18 elementary schools.

Sports and entertainment

The Monroe Civic Center has multiple facilities, the main complex being the Civic Center arena. The arena provides  of exhibit space along with 5,600 seats, with a larger potential capacity of up to 7,200 seats. The arena houses events such as banquets, circuses, and rodeos.

The center also holds the B. D. Robinson Conference Hall, Monroe Convention Center, equestrian pavilion, and the 2,200-seat W. L. Jack Howard Theatre named for W. L. "Jack" Howard, the Union Parish native who served as mayor of Monroe from 1956 to 1972 and again from 1976 to 1978. The Harvey H. Benoit Recreation Center is used for basketball games and has outdoor tennis courts.

During the last week of June, Monroe hosts the annual Miss Louisiana pageant. In the fiftieth competition, a winner was crowned on June 29, 2013, at the W. L. Jack Howard Theatre.

Monroe is the home of the Louisiana Purchase Gardens and Zoo, which collectively maintains over 500 animals. It also offers boat rides and a catwalk, in addition to other seasonal activities.

The Monroe area is home to several museums, including the Northeast Louisiana Children's Museum, the Biedenharn Museum and Gardens, the Chennault Aviation and Military Museum, the Masur Museum of Arts, and the Northeast Louisiana Delta African-American Heritage Museum. This is one of the twenty-six sites identified in the early 21st century as part of the state's African American Heritage Trail.

Golf
Bayou Desiard Country Club
Chennault Golf Course
Frenchman's Bend Country Club
The Links at Muny, Forsythe Park

Shopping
Pecanland Mall has major anchor stores: Belk, Dillard's, and JC Penney. The largest mall in North Louisiana, it has a total of 83 retail stores.

Media/press

Monroe is served by a Gannett newspaper, the Monroe News Star, formerly an afternoon daily owned and operated by the father-son team of publishers, Robert Wilson Ewing, I, and John D. Ewing. When the Ewing's Monroe Morning World ceased publication, the sister publication, the News Star, became the city's morning-only newspaper. Monroe is served by two African-American-owned weekly newspapers: the Monroe Free Press and the Monroe Dispatch.

The Free Press was founded in 1969 by Roosevelt Wright, Jr., and The Dispatch was founded in 1975 by Irma and Frank Detiege. The Ouachita Citizen is a locally owned and operated weekly newspaper that was founded in 1924. It has all-local coverage of events in Ouachita Parish, including Monroe, West Monroe, Sterlington and Richwood.

Radio
Monroe is served by local radio station KJLO, and KMVX, that also broad KMLB AM 540.

Emergency alert stations

KMLB-KNOE 540 AM
KMVX-KNOE 101.9 FM
KNOE TV 8
KTVE-TV 10
KARD-TV 14

National Guard

Monroe is home to the 528th Engineer Battalion of the Louisiana Army National Guard. This unit is part of the 225th Engineer Brigade which is headquartered in Pineville, Louisiana at Camp Beauregard.

Transportation
Monroe was the headquarters of Delta Air Lines during the second half of the 1920s. As it expanded, it moved to Atlanta. Monroe Regional Airport serves the city and northeast Louisiana. It has three main runways and is served by regional partners American Airlines, United Airlines, and Delta Air Lines.

Greyhound Bus Lines provides transportation from Monroe to many cities across the nation. Monroe has the oldest municipally-owned transit system in the nation. Created in 1906 as a four-line street railroad, the Monroe Transit System now provides 13 fixed bus routes covering most areas of the city, and three demand-response buses serving the disabled.

Monroe can be accessed from Interstate 20, U.S. Highway 165, Louisiana Highway 15, U.S. Highway 80, and Interstate 420 (proposed).

Kansas City Southern, Union Pacific, BNSF, and Norfolk Southern serve freight traffic in the city.

Notable people

References

External links
 
 
 

 
1845 establishments in Louisiana
Cities in Louisiana
Cities in North Louisiana
Cities in Ouachita Parish, Louisiana
Louisiana African American Heritage Trail
Parish seats in Louisiana
Populated places established in 1845
Louisiana populated places on the Ouachita River